Eugen O. Chirovici (born 1964) is a Romanian author of suspense and crime. Before moving to United Kingdom, he published ten detective novels in his home country. He is best known for his first English novel, The Book of Mirrors.

References

1964 births
Writers of books about writing fiction
Living people